Tazeh Kand-e Lalaklu (also Romanized as Tāzeh Kand-e Lalaklū) is a village in Marhemetabad-e Jonubi Rural District, in the Central District of Miandoab County, West Azerbaijan Province, Iran. At the 2006 census, its population was 518, in 114 families.

References 

Populated places in Miandoab County